Giovanni Cima may refer to:

Giovanni Paolo Cima, composer and organist
Cima da Conegliano (Giovanni Battista Cima), painter